Peen tong or pian tang and wong tong, is a Chinese brown sugar and sugar candy that is used in various Chinese desserts and also consumed alone as a snack. In China, it is sold in slab or brick form in one-pound packages, and occasionally as a bulk food item.

Use in dishes
Peen tong is used as an ingredient in desserts, sauces and sweet soups. Peen tong is sometimes used as an ingredient in nian gao, whereby the slab of peen tong is scraped and the resultant shavings are used in the dish. Another method for its use in nian gao is to dissolve the peen tong in water, which is less time-consuming compared to scraping it. It is used as an ingredient in jiandui (a sesame ball prepared using glutinous rice flour. Peen tong is also used in haptou wu, a sweet Chinese walnut soup.

See also

 Jaggery
 Panela
 Sugarloaf

References

Further reading

External links
 

Candy
Sugars
Chinese confectionery